The Peacock (Egyptian Arabic: الطاووس translit: Al-Tawous) is an Egyptian crime thriller film released in 1982. The film stars Salah Zulfikar, Nour El Sherief, Laila Taher and Raghda and directed by Kamal El Sheikh.

Plot 
Hussein in a forensic psychologist who was two sister nieces; Nadia and Samiha. Nadia is married to Hamdi and they live with Samiha, Hamdi is secretly in love with his wife's sister but he can't do anything about it, until one day he murder his wife and try to win her sister’s heart but her uncle Hussein knows about the crime of Hamdi and he tries with the help of the police to make him fall into their trap.

Cast 
 Salah Zulfikar as Hussein
 Nour El-Sherif as Hamdi
 Laila Taher as Nadia
 Raghda as Samiha
 Salah Rashwan as Nabil
 Adel Hashem as the investigator
 Muhammad Safwat as Police officer
 Fadia Okasha as Enayat
 Diaa Al-Mirghani as The pickpocket
 Youssef Al-Assal as Receptionist
 Ikhlas Hosni
 Bassem Sedky
 Fouad Atallah
 Mustafa Al-Mahdi
 Nassif Abul-Enein
 Hassan Totala
 Samia Samy

Reception 
The film was a box-office and critical success. Main cast actor Salah Zulfikar won the Ministry of Culture award in best actor role.

See also
 Salah Zulfikar filmography
 List of Egyptian films of 1982

References

External links 
 
The Peacock on elCinema

1982 films
1980s Arabic-language films
20th-century Egyptian films
Films shot in Egypt
Egyptian drama films
Egyptian crime films
Films directed by Kamal El Sheikh